Sir Arthur Dudley Spurling, CBE (9 November 1913 – 20 May 1986) was a Bermudian lawyer, politician, and swimmer.

Early life and family
Arthur Dudley Spurling was born on 9 November 1913 to Sir Salibury Stanley Spurling and Lady Frances Ellen Spurling. He married Marian Taylor in 1941, the daughter of Frank Gurr of St George's, Bermuda. They had 3 sons and 1 daughter. The eldest son, Stephen, pre-deceased him. The other 3 children are Richard, Michael and Ann 

He lived at Three Chimneys, No 5 Speaker's Drive, Wellington, St George's, Bermuda.

Career
Spurling was a barrister and justice of the peace and senior partner at Appleby, Spurling & Kempe (now known simply as 'Appleby') from 1948 to 1981. He was speaker of the House of Assembly, Bermuda, 1972–76.

Swimming
He competed in the men's 4 × 200 metre freestyle relay at the 1936 Summer Olympics.

Death and legacy
Spurling died on 20 May 1986. A scholarship is awarded by Butterfield in his name. A Bermudian singer uses his name for his act.

References

External links
 

1913 births
1986 deaths
Bermudian male swimmers
Olympic swimmers of Bermuda
Swimmers at the 1936 Summer Olympics
20th-century Bermudian lawyers
Bermudian justices of the peace
Bermudian politicians
Lawyers awarded knighthoods
United Bermuda Party politicians
Knights Bachelor
Bermudian Rhodes Scholars
Alumni of Trinity College, Oxford
Members of Lincoln's Inn